Our Bande Àpart is the seventh studio album by American alternative rock band Third Eye Blind. It was released on September 24, 2021.

Background
After releasing their sixth studio album, Screamer, in October 2019, Third Eye Blind was able to complete the first leg of the tour supporting it but was forced to cancel the second leg in 2020, due to the COVID-19 pandemic—the first time they had to cancel in 22 years. Unable to tour, the band turned to recording further music.

Writing and recording
Stephan Jenkins started the writing sessions for the album in early 2020, in seclusion, under lockdown in the early days of the pandemic. Recording began as soon as the lockdowns ended and the band could reassemble. Jenkins noted the sessions were the most enjoyable he had ever experienced, due to everyone's excitement to be together and creating music again. Plans for the release initially started as an EP while recording first demos, but later expanded to a full-length album. During the sessions, guitarist Kryz Reid insisted they perform a cover of Joy Division's "Disorder" during their initial sound tests. Jenkins, surprised by the energy he felt they captured, suggested the band not only record a studio version of the cover but also release it right away in May 2020, as part of various musical artists' effort to create a tribute to Joy Division singer Ian Curtis on the fortieth anniversary of his death.

While writing the song "Again", Jenkins envisioned himself singing it with Bethany Cosentino of the band Best Coast. Upon finding out that Cosentino lived just a few blocks away from the Eagle Rock recording studio, Jenkins was able to convince her to sing on the track. Cosentino finished her vocals in just two takes. Jenkins originally envisioned them singing a vocal harmony but instead felt that just singing in unison captured his intended energy better. Other collaborations on the album include contributions from the Smashing Pumpkins' guitarist Jeff Schroeder, and Poliça and Marijuana Deathsquads' Ryan Olson.

Themes and composition
The single "Again" was described as "breezy, power-poppy alt-rock [the band] made in the [19]90s" and a "fuzzy, catchy, punk-adjacent pop jam". Jenkins himself described it as an end-of-summer "surf rock" song. Thematically, the track is about longing for a post-COVID, normal life.

Release and promotion
The album's name, Our Bande Àpart, was announced on July 30, 2021, the same day as the first single, "Box of Bones", was released. The track "Again" came out on August 20. A third song, "To the Sea", was released on September 16. The album was published on September 24, 2021. A "making of the album" documentary, directed by Kryz Reid, entitled How We Hold Each Other Right Now: The Making of Our Bande Àpart, premiered on the same day, at the Gramercy Theatre in New York City.

Track listing

Personnel
Third Eye Blind
 Stephan Jenkins – vocals, guitar, drums, percussion, production
 Brad Hargreaves – drums
 Kryz Reid – guitar
 Alex LeCavalier – bass
 Colin Creev – keyboards, guitar, vocals, production

Technical
 Ted Jensen – mastering
 Neal Avron – mixing
 Carlos de la Garza – mixing
 Ryan Olson – mixing
 Peter Min – engineering
 Curtis Peoples – vocal production
 Ryan Short – editing
 Daniel Nolan – technician

Design
 David Wexler – art direction
 Jef Harmatz – illustrations, production design
 Travis Shinn – band photo

References

2021 albums
Third Eye Blind albums